Paramesotriton, also known as warty newts or Asian warty newts, is a genus of salamanders in the family Salamandridae. The genus is found in southwestern and southern China and in northern Vietnam. Most of the species are endemic to China, and the majority of them have been described recently, since 2008. The genus includes both pond and stream dwellers.

Taxonomy and systematics
The sister taxon of Paramesotriton is Laotriton. The genus may be divided into two species groups (subgenera), Paramesotriton and Allomesotriton.

Description
Paramesotriton have a dark brown dorsum with a prominent vertebral ridge, often also a pair of lateral ridges. The tail is high and laterally compressed. Skin texture varies from relatively smooth to very rough. Paramesotriton hongkongensis has toxic skin and ova, as has been shown for many other salamanders.

Species
Paramesotriton contains the following 14 species:
 Paramesotriton aurantius Yuan, Wu, Zhou, and Che, 2016
 Paramesotriton caudopunctatus (Liu and Hu, 1973) — spot-tailed warty newt
 Paramesotriton chinensis (Gray, 1859) — Chinese warty newt
 Paramesotriton deloustali (Bourret, 1934) — Tam Dao salamander, Vietnamese salamander
 Paramesotriton fuzhongensis Wen, 1989 — Wanggao warty newt
 Paramesotriton guangxiensis (Huang, Tang, and Tang, 1983) — Guangxi warty newt
 Paramesotriton hongkongensis (Myers and Leviton, 1962) — Hong Kong warty newt, Hong Kong newt
 Paramesotriton labiatus (Unterstein, 1930)
 Paramesotriton longliensis Li, Tian, Gu, and Xiong, 2008
 Paramesotriton maolanensis Gu, Chen, Tian, Li, and Ran, 2012
 Paramesotriton qixilingensis Yan, Zhao, Jiang, Hou, He, Murphy, and Che, 2014
 Paramesotriton wulingensis Wang, Tian, and Gu, 2013
 Paramesotriton yunwuensis Wu, Jiang, and Hanken, 2010
 Paramesotriton zhijinensis Li, Tian, and Gu, 2008 — Zhijin warty newt

References

External links

 
Amphibian genera
Amphibians of Asia
Taxonomy articles created by Polbot